Eberhard Schöler (born 22 December 1940) is a retired table tennis competitor from West Germany who won several medals at the world and European championships between 1962 and 1972. He was a defensive player known for his calm demeanor, for which he received a nickname "Mr. Poker Face".

Schöler has a degree in business administration. In early 1966, he married Diane Rowe, a table tennis player from England who later competed for Germany; they often competed in mixed doubles together. Schöler and Rowe have a daughter Cindy (born 1968) and son Christian (born 1974). Schöler retired from competitions in the 1970s, but came back in the 1980s and won a silver medal at the 1986 World Championships in the masters category. Since 1990s he held leading positions at the national, European and International Table Tennis Federations.

References

External links
Eberhard Schöler at Table Tennis Media

German male table tennis players
1940s births
Living people
People from Złotów
People from the Province of Pomerania
World Table Tennis Championships medalists